San Francisco Glens Soccer Club, commonly known as SF Glens, is an American soccer club based in San Francisco that was founded in 1961. Their men's first team currently competes in USL League Two and women's first team in the USL W League, both in the fourth tier of the American Soccer Pyramid.

Before establishing a USL League Two franchise in 2018, the Glens had been a longtime member of the San Francisco Soccer Football League (SFSFL) and were once affiliated with the San Francisco Seals' PDL team, which is now defunct. The Glens continue to field three SFSFL teams, but the USL League Two franchise is now the club's official first team.

Since the hiring of Executive Director Mike McNeill, who also doubles as General Manager of the USL2 first team, the club has grown from just two local youth teams to the largest soccer club in San Francisco. The Glens' nationally renowned academy program is the only one in the city with all age groups for MLS Next that begins at Under-13 level and runs concurrently through the Under-19 level. The U19 team made history in 2022 as the first San Francisco team to advance to the MLS NEXT Cup final where they were edged by the New England Revolution 1-0.

Combined as one entity (USL League Two first team, SFSFL second, third, and fourth teams, and SF Glens Academy youth teams), the Glens field over 70 teams and over 1,000 active players.

The Glens also have ties abroad as the official North American partner of 2. Bundesliga club Holstein Kiel. In addition to having the MLS NEXT full pathway, they are the only youth club in San Francisco with membership in the USL Academy. 

They also have an official partnership the San Jose Earthquakes of Major League Soccer. Recent examples of that arrangement is current U.S. Youth National Team midfielder Cruz Medina, who played with the Glens Academy before joining the Earthquakes, as well as the Glens hosting MLS Next Pro games for the Quakes in San Francisco.

History

Beginnings
The Glens were founded on January 28, 1961 by Dr. Michael McFadden as one of a number of Irish American amateur sides that had emerged in the SFSFL during the 1960s. The emergence of the Glens during this period was based on the coaching of Irishman Neil Hagan coupled with a talented crop of young players like Tom and Steve Ryan, Jim Boyle, and Tom and Tim Harvey, among others.

It was also during these early years when the club struck up a friendship with Celtic F.C. that still endures today, when the European giants visited San Francisco in 1957 to play a friendly match and as legend has it, provided the Glens with their first kits when they debuted four years later.

National Amateur Success
The result of Hagan's leadership was promotion to the SFSFL's Premier division by the end of the decade. The Glens went on to national prominence by advancing all the way to the National Amateur Cup final in 1979 where they lost 1–0 to Atlanta Datagraphic. Their national success also spilled over into qualification for the prestigious U.S. Open Cup three times in a five-year stretch from 1978–1982.

SFSFL Title Teams
The untimely death of Hagan in 1981 left a void that might have been the end of other clubs. However, Sean Shannon stepped into the spotlight and quietly remolded the team into a championship-winning outfit by bringing in players such as Paul Mitchell and Mal Roche. By 1984, the Glens captured their first SFSFL championship in 1984—the first by an Irish side. In 1990, they returned to the National Amateur Cup final that season. Unfortunately, they were on the wrong side of another 1–0 result, this time to the St. Petersburg Kickers. Three years later under Shannon, the Glens captured their second SFSFL title.

Return to the SFSFL
After a brief hiatus, the SF Glens returned to the SFSFL in 2015 with a Premier Division and reserve team open to all comers. Three years later behind coach Bill Chu, the SFSFL Glens earned a berth in the California Soccer Association North (CSAN) State Cup Final, falling to Club Marin in extra time, 4–2.

A New Era in USL League Two
In 2018, the Glens announced the establishment of a new franchise in the USL Premier Development League with dual intentions: to create a top of the pyramid for their SF Glens Academy youth program and SFSFL teams, and also to set a foundation to enter the professional ranks in the future. J. Ramon Estevez was hired as the PDL franchise's inaugural team president/general manager and Javier Ayala-Hil as head coach. Mike McNeill, executive director of football for the youth side, doubled as a member of the PDL front office as well.

Though the Glens missed the playoffs in their first PDL season, they closed the campaign on a four-game unbeaten streak and were one of only two teams to take points from eventual Southwest Division champion FC Golden State Force.

In September 2018, the club announced that U.S. World Cup veteran and MLS Cup champion Jimmy Conrad had agreed to become their new technical director and associate head coach. In December 2018, Mike McNeill took on the reins of the team presidency. One month later, the Glens had four players selected in the 2019 MLS SuperDraft and two (Sam Junqua and Roy Boateng) in the first round—a first for any San Francisco club and the third-most among all clubs in the PDL, now rebranded as USL League Two.

The Glens entered an official partnership with 2. Bundesliga club Holstein Kiel in 2019, as San Francisco and Kiel are sister cities. The team had a tough USL League Two season on the field, but Nabilai Kibunguchy stood out as a midfielder on the Western Conference Team of the Year. 

In February 2020, the club announced that Ayala-Hil would step down as head coach and McNeill named Conrad his successor. However, the 2020 USL League Two season was canceled due to safety concerns stemming from the COVID-19 pandemic.

In March 2021, the club announced the future construction of a soccer-specific facility at Treasure Island, a first for a local club in the 120-year history of soccer in San Francisco. Meanwhile, coaches Bill Chu and Cameron Chu led a banner year for the Glens' SFSFL teams, as the Second Team qualified for the Premier Division playoffs, the Third Team finished in the top four of the Majors Division, and the Under-23 Fourth Team won the First Division.

The 2022 USL League Two season saw changes to the staff, with Conrad returning to his original role as technical director and Gabe Saucedo elevating from head associate coach to head coach. The result was a finish in the top four of the Southwest Division and a national playoff berth for the first time in club history. In the Western Conference Quarterfinals, the Glens traveled to Seattle to upset top-seeded Capital FC (the rebranded Portland Timbers U23) 3-2, but fell by the same score in extra time in the semifinals to host Ballard FC. Max Chrétien led the team with nine goals and five assists, while Academy product Diego Grande added eight scores of his own. Kevyn Lo was named to the Western Conference Team of the Year.

The SFSFL teams enjoyed another successful season in 2022, with the Second Team qualifying for the playoffs for the second consecutive season, the Third Team winning the Majors Division, and the Under-23 Fourth Team finishing runners-up in the third tier. The SFSFL also held their 120th Anniversary Open Cup in August of that year for all divisions in the league and it resulted in an all-Glens final, with the Under-23 team defeating the Second Team 2-1 to take home the trophy.

On September 7, 2022, the Glens broke ground on their new facility at Treasure Island with Mayor London Breed one of the guest speakers. Two days later, they hosted the San Jose Earthquakes' second team at Negoesco Stadium and ran operations for their MLS Next Pro game against Real Monarchs. A sellout crowd was on hand to watch the first professional soccer game in the city since the now-defunct San Francisco Deltas won the NASL championship game at Kezar Stadium in 2017.

Glens add Women's First Team

In December 2022, the club announced the addition of a women's first team in the new NorCal Division of the USL W League.

Supporters

The SF Glens supporters' group is known as the SF Glens Brigade, or Briogáid Ghleann (as it is known in Irish Gaelic as a nod to the club's Irish roots). They currently meet at Skyline College for matches and travel on the road to support the club.

Kit sponsors

The SF Glens made history when they announced that global brand Carlsberg would be the presenting sponsor for their inaugural season kit, as Liverpool F.C., Wimbledon F.C., and F.C. Copenhagen are the only other club teams in association soccer to ever don the renowned beer company's logo on the front of their jerseys. The Glens' other kit sponsors are Soccerloco, Rubica, and Thomas Quinn Law. In addition, the club entered a contract with Casa Sanchez Foods to feature the iconic Jimmy the Cornman logo on their coaches' apparel. In 2019, Powerade became the club's training kit sponsor.

Squad

Current squad
The following 18 players were named in the squad for the USL League Two Western Conference Semifinals against Ballard FC on July 24, 2022.

Recent callups

Record

SFSFL (top team only)

USL League Two

Former Glens in the pros 

 Sam Junqua - 2018 - selected in 2019 MLS SuperDraft by Houston Dynamo (1st round, 8th overall)
 Roy Boateng - 2018 - selected in 2019 MLS SuperDraft by New York Red Bulls (1st round, 16th overall)
 Shinya Kadono - 2018 - selected in 2019 MLS SuperDraft by D.C. United (3rd round, 72nd overall)
 Sam Ebstein - 2018 - selected in 2019 MLS SuperDraft by FC Dallas (4th round, 87th overall)
 Yohannes Harish - 2018-19 - signed by Oakland Roots SC, 2019 
 Luke Dennison - 2018 - signed by Longford Town FC, 2019 
 Aydan Bowers - 2019 - signed by FC Helsingor, 2019 
 Amir Bashti - 2019 - signed by Atlanta United 2, 2019 
 Salifu Jatta - 2019 - signed by Oakland Roots SC, 2019 
 Drake Callender - 2019^ - signed by Inter Miami CF, 2019
 Isaiah Dargan - 2018-19 - signed by Chattanooga Red Wolves, 2020 
 Simon Lekressner - 2019^ - selected in 2020 MLS SuperDraft by New England Revolution (2nd round, 30th overall)
 Andrew Konstantino - 2018-19 - signed by Reno 1868 FC, 2020 
 Jonathan Orozco - 2019 - signed by Oakland Roots SC, 2020 
 Josiah Romero - 2019 - signed by Oakland Roots SC, 2020 
 Arda Bulut - 2018-19 - signed by Louisville City FC, 2020 
 Nabilai Kibunguchy - 2019 - selected in 2021 MLS SuperDraft by Minnesota United FC (1st round, 18th overall)
 Tyler Moss - 2019 - signed by FC Tucson, 2022
 Zach Ryan - 2019 - signed by New York Red Bulls, 2022
 Rei Dorwart - 2018-19 - signed by Bay Cities FC, 2022
 Andrew Paoli - 2018 - signed by Bay Cities FC, 2022
 Gabe Silveira - 2018 - signed by Bay Cities FC, 2022
 C.J. Grey - 2018 - signed by San Jose Earthquakes II, 2022
 Cruz Medina - 2017-19^^ - signed by San Jose Earthquakes, 2022

^signed with Glens but did not play in an official game
^^played for SF Glens Academy

Team honors 

SFSFL
Premier Division:  1983–84, 1989–90
Division II: 1978–79, 2001, 2022^
Division III: 1977–78, 2021^^
Division IV: 1976–77

^won by SF Glens Third Team
^^won by SF Glens Under-23 Fourth Team

National Amateur Cup
California North: 1978–79, 1979–80, 1982–83
National Finalists: 1979, 1990

U.S. Open Cup
 California North: 1977–78, 1979–80, 1980–81

California State Cup
Champions: 1983–84
Finalists: 2018

California State Intermediate Cup (1): 1968–69

Carlsberg Cup
S.F. Champions: 2001
National Finalists: 2001

SFSFL 120th Anniversary Cup
 Champions: 2022^^^
 Finalists: 2022^^^

^^^SF Glens Under-23 Fourth Team defeated SF Glens Third Team 2-1 in final

References

External links 
SF Glens Soccer Club

National Premier Soccer League teams
G
1961 establishments in California
1961 in San Francisco
Association football clubs established in 1961
USL League Two teams
Glens of the United States